The 46th International Suzuka 1000 km was endurance event that took place on August 27, 2017 at the Suzuka Circuit in Suzuka City, Japan. It was the 46th edition of the 1000 km Suzuka at Suzuka, and the last as part of the Super GT Series, also being the last running under the 1000-kilometer format. The race was won by the Nakajima Racing team with Bertrand Baguette and Kosuke Matsuura driving.

Results

References

Suzuka 1000
Suzuka